

Vagabond
Vagabond (real name Priscilla Lyons) is the former partner & girlfriend of Nomad (Jack Monroe). She prevented Black Racer's assassination attempt on Sidewinder. She thwarted and captured Dr. Karl Malus during his attempt to take over Power Broker, Inc. She was recruited and trained by the Scourge organization; during her training she had a change of heart and decided to help the U.S. Agent shut down the Scourge organization. Later she was being considered as a potential recruit for the Initiative program, according to Civil War: Battle Damage Report.

Other versions of Vagabond
Vagabond (real name Pat Murphy) is a superhero, a police officer who dressed as a homeless man, who appeared in U.S.A. Comics #2-4.

Vakume

Valkin

Valkyrie

Brunnhilde

Samantha Parrington

Barbara Norris

Vamp
Vamp is a Corporation agent in the Marvel Universe. The character, created by Roy Thomas, Don Glut, and John Buscema, first appeared in Captain America #217 in January 1978. Within the context of the stories, Vamp has an evil alter-ego called Animus and infiltrates S.H.I.E.L.D. She is killed by the Scourge of the Underworld,.

Years later, Arnim Zola created a Vamp/Animus proto-husk creature, which would encounter Deadpool on two separate occasions.

Rachel Van Helsing
Rachel Van Helsing is a vampire hunter, created by Archie Goodwin and Gene Colan, who first appeared in Tomb of Dracula #3 (July 1972). She is the granddaughter of Abraham Van Helsing, and trained a vampire hunter since childhood by Quincy Harker after Dracula killed her parents. On one of her missions, Rachel was held hostage by two of Dracula's brides who phoned Quincy Harker, who was on the verge of killing Dracula, and told him to leave Dracula alone or Rachel would die. Harker agreed to the brides' demands, much to Rachel's frustration. The brides then let Rachel go. She later fought alongside hunters Quincy, Taj Nital, Frank Drake, and Blade, during which time she developed an uneasy romantic relationship with Drake. Dracula turns her into a vampire. Overcoming his control, she asks Wolverine to kill her, which he does. Frank Drake later avenges her death by aiding Doctor Strange in destroying all vampires on Earth.

Rachel Van Helsing in other media
 Rachel Van Helsing appears in the Toei Tomb of Dracula anime TV movie (Dracula: Sovereign of the Damned), voiced by Mami Koyama in the original Japanese and by Melanie McQueen in the English dub.

Michael Van Patrick

Vanguard
Vanguard (Nikolai Krylenko) is a mutant in the Marvel Universe. Created by Bill Mantlo and Carmine Infantino, the character first appeared in Iron Man #109 in April 1978. Within the context of the stories, Vanguard is one of the Soviet Super-Soldiers and the son of Sergei Krylov. He is trained as a soldier and comes into conflict with Iron Man, Jack of Hearts, and other Avengers. After dying and being resurrected by his father during the Dire Wraith invasion of Russia, Vanguard becomes the new Red Guardian and leads the Winter Guard. As the new Red Guardian, he battles Weapon X, King Hyperion, and the Intelligencia. He was later present when the Winter Guard was reunited.

Krylenko is the brother of Laynia Petrovna. He is a mutant, capable of generating a body-wide force field that repels electromagnetic and kinetic energy. He typically focuses this field through a medium, such as the vibranium shield supplied to him by Executive Security Committee or through a sickle and hammer that he usually carries. He also directs this force against the earth itself to obtain flight. Krylenko wears a more advanced suit than previous Red Guardians, which is lined with circuitry that works in conjunction with the compact computer on his shield, not only enabling the guided flight and return of what he's using to focus his mutant energy through their digital connection, but the amplification of the effects of his own energy field.

Vanisher

Vapor

Vargas
Vargas is a supervillain in the Marvel Universe. The character, created by Chris Claremont and Salvador Larroca, first appeared in X-Treme X-Men #1 in 2001. Within the context of the stories, Vargas comes into conflict with the X-Men while searching for the diaries of Destiny and even managed to kill Psylocke. He's not a mutant, since he lacks the X-Gene in his DNA, but is not fully human either, much like Captain America is a relatively perfect human physical specimen. He is genetically perfect and claims to be "homo superior superior", humanity's "natural response" to the emergence of mutants, and possesses super-strength and speed in addition to highly advanced combat skills and an increased immune system that protected him from any disease or toxin and an elevated healing factor. After obtaining one volume of Destiny's journals he discovered that he would be killed by Rogue. Resolving to deny this destiny, Vargas faced her in Madripoor. Initially Vargas had the upper hand, but Rogue gradually absorbed his abilities each time he struck her until she was his equal, his superior considering her other powers. Poised to slay Vargas, she is seen preparing to stab him with his own sword when the video camera that was the sole witness to the event lost power at the critical moment, so the people that viewed the footage of the live invasion were under the belief that Rogue did in fact, kill him. However some time later its revealed that Rogue realizing that the diaries could trap you into doing what it stated, or into committing great atrocities to avoid the "prophecies", had in fact left Vargas alive in order to discredit the diaries, but since he had possessed one of Destiny's diaries and therefore had knowledge of future events, he was targeted by the Marauders, under Mr. Sinister's orders, and eliminated after being stabbed by one of Harpoon's eponymous weapons.

Varnae
Varnae is a vampire in the Marvel Universe. The character, created by Steve Perry and Steve Bissette, first appeared in Bizarre Adventures #33 (December 1982). Within the context of the stories, Varnae is the first vampire and is the one who created Dracula. At various times in his life, he is an enemy of King Kull, Frank Drake, and John Blaze. He eventually tired of his eternal life and committed suicide by walking into sunlight and disintegrating into dust, but he was resurrected years later by the voodoo priestess Marie Laveau. He was then confronted by Doctor Strange. The Sorcerer Supreme and the Lord of the Vampires battled, Varnae changing shape and revealing he had formerly sought to be the Sorcerer Supreme before he turned into a vampire. Doctor Strange cast an "incantation of oblivion" on Varnae, making the undead mage relive his oblivion of 500 years. Embracing his existence as a vampire again, Varnae fled, claiming that he finally had a reason to live again: a worthy foe.

Vector

Veil
Veil, also known as Madeline Berry, was created by Christos Gage and Mike McKone. She first appeared in Avengers Academy #1 (August 2010). She has the ability to change into a gaseous form, which enables her to sneak around without being detected and renders her immune to most forms of attack.

Berry learns that her powers are causing her molecules to drift apart, so that she will eventually die or fade from existence, and decides to enjoy the limited time she has left, quitting the academy and joining Jeremy Briggs' corporation. She soon finds a cure, but it renders her powerless. She then returns to regular high school, using her training to defend herself from bullies.

Velocidad
Velocidad (Gabriel Cohuelo) is a mutant in the Marvel Universe. The character, created by Matt Fraction and Kieron Gillen, first appeared in The Uncanny X-Men #527 in 2010.

Gabriel is a 16-year-old mutant from Mexico City. He is unable to control his mutant powers until assisted by Hope Summers. Gabriel follows Hope on her mission to find other young mutants, and they ally with Oya and Primal. He and his friends relocate to Utopia, where they are trained by more experienced X-Men. Gabriel and Hope begin a romantic relationship, but it ends when Hope discovers him kissing Pixie. Because Velocidad's powers work by accelerating him through time, the use of his powers causes rapid aging. A four-hour mission can last several days from his perspective, and he is capable of burning through several days of his life in a matter of minutes.

Other versions of Velocidad
Gabriel briefly appears during Age of X.

Vengeance

Lt. Michael Badilino

Deputy Kowalski

Robert "Bobby" M. Blackthorne

Venom

Eddie Brock

Mac Gargan

Lee Price

Venomm

Venus

Siren

Aphrodite Pandemos

Vermin

Kristoff Vernard

Vertigo

Salem's Seven

Savage Land Mutate

Vessel

Vibraxas

Vibro
Vibro, also known as Alton Vibereaux, was created by Denny O'Neil and Luke McDonnell and first appeared in Iron Man #186 (September 1984). Working as a seismologist and engineer, he fell into the San Andreas Fault during the testing of an experimental nuclear-powered apparatus, giving him superpowers and leaving him mentally unstable. He battles James Rhodes as Iron Man. He is later sent to the Vault, a prison for superpowered individuals. Alongside the Griffin, he attempts to escape, encountering the Falcon and Nomad.

Vibro is killed and resurrected by the Hand, and joins an assault on the S.H.I.E.L.D. helicarrier. Mandarin and Zeke Stane later recruit him to help defeat Iron Man.

Vibro has the ability to generate high-level seismic vibrations and fire them from his hands as vibratory or concussive force, causing shockwaves, opening chasms, and/or generating earthquakes. He can harness the energy of his vibratory force emissions for flight at subsonic speeds, and he has the ability to generate shields of vibratory force around himself. His powers decrease in magnitude as his distance from the San Andreas Fault increases. He also wears body armor of an unknown composition and synthetic stretch fabric. As Vibreaux, he has a Ph.D. in geological engineering.

Victorius

Vidar

Vindicator

Viper

Jordan Stryke

Ophelia Sarkissian (Madame Hydra)

Unnamed

Hobgoblin's Viper

Virgo

Elaine McLaughlin

LMD

Ecliptic

Thanos' Virgo

Vishanti

Visimajoris
Visimajoris is a demon who has clashed with Doctor Strange.

Vision

Aarkus

Victor Shade

Jonas

Viv Vision

Vivian "Viv" Vision is an android in Marvel Comics. She was created by Tom King and Gabriel Hernandez Walta and first appeared in Vision (vol. 3) #1 (January 2016).

Viv, along with her brother Vin, was created by Vision, using a combination of his and his wife Virginia's brainwaves, as part of an attempt to create a family. The siblings are sent to Alexander Hamilton High School, but assigned different schedules. Both children are attacked by Eric Williams (Grim Reaper), with Viv more seriously damaged than her brother. Vision repairs her with the help of Tony Stark.

When Viv learns that her mother killed a classmate she befriended, she becomes distraught and begins to resent her mother. When both her brother and mother die, she and Vision try to carry on with their family life.

She joins the teen superhero team the Champions, alongside Ms. Marvel (Kamala Khan), Spider-Man (Miles Morales), Nova (Sam Alexander), Hulk (Amadeus Cho), and later Teen Cyclops.

During the story arc Worlds Collide, Viv is captured by the High Evolutionary, who evolves her into a human. She later apparently sacrifices herself to save Earth and counter-Earth, but is actually transported into another dimension. Believing Viv to be dead, Vision constructs a second Viv, dubbed Viv 2.0. The original Viv manages to return to reality, but not before the second Viv is activated. Later, Viv 2.0 attempts to kill the original but is damaged and becomes brain-dead. The original Viv transplants her consciousness to the other Viv's body, effectively restoring the character to her android state.

In time, she develops romantic feelings for her teammate Ironheart, surprising her with a kiss. Riri reacts with revulsion due to internalised homophobia, but after a later incident with Blackheart, who exploited several of the Champions' (including Riri's) own self-doubts and turned them against their teammates, it is Viv's affection (and a returned Viv 2.0, alive inside Viv) which snaps Riri out of his control and finally acknowledge her friend's feelings.

Powers and abilities of Viv Vision
Viv possesses the same powers as her father, including super strength, intangibility and flight. She also possesses a jewel on her forehead that absorbs solar energy. When she was a human she had no special abilities.

Viv Vision in other media
Viv Vision was a playable character in Marvel Avengers Academy.
Viv Vision appears as a playable character in Lego Marvel Super Heroes 2, as part of the Champions DLC.

Amelia Voght

Voice

Philip Nolan Voigt

Volcana

Volla

Volstagg

Lucia von Bardas

Lucia von Bardas is a fictional supervillain who first appeared in the 2004 storyline Secret War. She was created by Brian Michael Bendis and Gabriele Dell'Otto.

The character is a Latverian woman who used to teach at the University of North Carolina in the United States. After Victor von Doom was deposed as the leader of Latveria, the Americans help von Bardas get elected as the country's new prime minister. She then begins publicly mending the ties between the two countries. In truth, she is secretly funding American technology-based supercriminals through the Tinkerer. The United Nations espionage agency S.H.I.E.L.D. uncovered this, but the President of the United States declines to take action, believing that relationship is relatively good and that they can simply negotiate. S.H.I.E.L.D. director Nick Fury subsequently gathered a group of superheroes consisting of the Black Widow, Captain America, Daredevil, Luke Cage, Spider-Man, and Wolverine, as well as superpowered S.H.I.E.L.D. agent Daisy Johnson, for an undercover mission to overthrow the Latverian government and assassinate von Bardas. In Latveria, Johnson used her seismic powers to take down Castle Doom, apparently killing the prime minister.

Von Bardas survives to become a deformed cyborg. A year later she attacks Cage, leaving him in a coma, and is eventually defeated once more by Johnson.

She has recently resurfaced, having regained a far less deformed-looking body, working with the Red Ghost on a plan to use KGB super-spies placed in suspended animation to frame Doctor Doom for starting a nuclear war. She later returns to Latveria to rule it and help rebuild it.

Von Bardas is a cyborg whose abilities include flight and generation of a force field. Prior to this, she was a skilled diplomat. While at first her cybernetic implants were mostly external, currently she sports a more organic look with only a cybernetic eye exposed.

Lucia von Bardas in other media

Television
 Lucia von Bardas appears in the animated television series Fantastic Four: World's Greatest Heroes voiced by Venus Terzo. She is the android assistant to Doctor Doom. She is destroyed by the Invisible Woman.
 Lucia von Bardas appears in The Avengers: Earth's Mightiest Heroes voiced by Kristen Potter. In the episode "The Breakout" Pt. 1, she represents Doctor Doom in a meeting with A.I.M. to purchase stolen Stark Industries-based technology before Iron Man intervenes and defeats the latter while von Bardas escapes. In "The Private War of Doctor Doom", she is killed by the Black Panther.
 In the fourth season of Arrested Development, Lucia von Bardas appears as the villain, portrayed by Lucille Bluth (played by Jessica Walter), in Tobias' Fantastic Four musical at Cinco de Cuarto.

Video Games
 Lucia von Bardas appears in Marvel: Ultimate Alliance 2, voiced by Lani Minella. In the first mission during the Secret War, she funds the Tinkerer, in his efforts to supply technology to supervillains. Nick Fury and the heroes confront her, but her castle explodes due to the heroes defeating one of Tinkerer's superpowered machines. She later attacks New York as a deformed cyborg. When the heroes and Ms. Marvel attack her on a ship, she turns herself into a bomb, taking Diamondback, Scorcher, Shocker, and Wizard along as well, only to be defeated and deactivated by the heroes. In the PSP, Wii, and PS2 versions of the game, she invades New York directly. This eventually culminates in the heroes following her to Times Square, where she has planted a massive bomb. Upon the bomb's destruction, she collapses, lamenting her failure to Latveria.

Baron Von Blitzschlag

Friedrich Von Roehm

Andrea and Andreas von Strucker

Werner von Strucker

Baron Wolfgang von Strucker

Voyager

Vulcan

Vulture

Adrian Toomes

Raniero "Blackie" Drago

Clifton Shallot

Vulturions

Jimmy Natale

References

Marvel Comics characters: V, List of